Sargaz-e Khazor Safakalinu (also Romanized as Sargaz-e Khaz̤or Şafākalīnū; also known as Gūr Şafā and Sargaz) is a village in Dar Agah Rural District, in the Central District of Hajjiabad County, Hormozgan Province, Iran. At the 2006 census, its population was 79, in 23 families.

References 

Populated places in Hajjiabad County